Psammodromus microdactylus, the green psammodromus or small-fingered psammodromus, is a species of lizards in the family Lacertidae. It is endemic to Morocco.

Its natural habitats are Mediterranean-type shrubby vegetation and temperate grassland.
It is threatened by habitat loss.

References 

microdactylus
Endemic fauna of Morocco
Reptiles described in 1881
Taxa named by Oskar Boettger
Taxonomy articles created by Polbot